Roberts Island, is a community in the Canadian province of Nova Scotia, located in the Yarmouth Municipal District in Yarmouth County .

History
The island was called, Île La Tour by Acadians as Charles de Saint-Étienne de la Tour had a trading post in this area. A settlement on the island prior to the Acadian Expulsion was also known as "Ouikmakagan".

The island is the point of origination of Pasta primavera. In 1975, New York chef Sirio Maccioni flew to the Canadian summer home of Italian Baron Carlo Amato, called Shangri-La Ranch located on the island. Maccioni and his two top chefs began experimenting with game and fish, but eventually the baron and his guests wanted something different. Maccioni then mixed butter, cream and cheese, with vegetables and pasta together and brought the recipe back to New York City.

References

Communities in Yarmouth County
General Service Areas in Nova Scotia